Adventure Life is an adventure travel company offering private journeys, small group tours, and expedition voyages throughout the world. From their beginnings as a Latin America specialist in South America and Central America land tours, they have grown to now offer trips around the globe including less conventional destinations such as Africa, the Arctic, Antarctica and Alaska.

Their focus is nature, cultural, and active travel, and they apply ecotourism principles to their tour and cruise programs.  Most trips have a maximum group size of 12, yet typically run with 6 or fewer travelers. A large portion of travelers arrange customized or private itineraries. Since their founding in 1999, over 24,000 clients have traveled with the company.

Adventure Life is registered in the State of Montana as ALJ, Inc., and they do business as Adventure Life.

History
Adventure Life was founded by Brian Morgan in 1999.  Morgan was working as a consultant in Quito for CARE in the late 1990s, but decided to return home to Montana. While applying for jobs in Montana, Morgan planned a group tour back to Ecuador and promoted it locally. This experience made him recognize that guided tours were a service in demand, and a niche industry that his own travel experiences and Ecuadorian connections had prepared him to explore further.

Adventure Life launched in February 1999 with Spanish language study-trips, internships, and tours to Peru and Ecuador. Office was initially located in Havre, Montana, and Morgan hired the first staff member. During the first year of business, Adventure Life had fewer than 100 travelers.

Starting in 2000, the company decided to focus on only offering tours and no longer provides Spanish language study-trips or internships. The office moved from Havre and settled in Missoula, Montana. By the end of 2000, the company hires four full-time staff members. The company established a partner office in Lima, Peru.

Between 2001-2003, Adventure Life added tours to Bolivia, Costa Rica and Belize, Chile, Argentina, Patagonia and Guatemala. The company also established a second partner office in Quito, Ecuador. The company moved from Morgan's home into its first office. In 2005, tours started sending travelers to Antarctica, and in 2006 they added Panama to the list of destinations.

During 2007-2008 Adventure Life began offering small-ship cruises throughout the world. During 2007, Adventure Life provides trips for over 3500 travelers. In 2008 the Falkland Islands were added to tour options. Company launches an online community forum offering traveler Trip Journals - the system utilizes the services of Google Maps. In 2009 Nicaragua is added, and in 2011 Uruguay is added.  In 2012, Mexico and Colombia trips were added to Adventure Life's selection.  Brazil and Africa were added in 2013, further broadening destination options for travelers.

The growing company of Adventure Life moved into a new office building near downtown Missoula at the end of 2012.

Responsible travel
Galapagos Conservation Fundraising
Adventure Life is an active member of the International Galapagos Tour Operators Association, (IGTOA). The president of Adventure Life, Brian Morgan, served as the president of IGTOA from 2006-2009. In Nov. 2006, IGTOA they launched a Galapagos traveler-funding program for island conservation, and Adventure Life was one of the first members to adopt this initiative. A voluntary donation is added to all of Adventure Life's Galapagos travelers’ invoices. 40% of this donation goes to IGTOA and 60% goes to the Charles Darwin Foundation. Dollar for dollar, Adventure Life matches these donations with travel vouchers for future trips with their company. Since its inception, Adventure Life’s travelers have raised over $100,000 for island conservation.

IGTOA supports program in the Galapagos that include both Conservation and Professional Standards. Conservation funding is for projects that directly impact issues like introduced species, patrol of the park, and scientific research.  Professional Standards relates to boat safety; passenger care; training and treatment of captains and crew members; guide training; educating travelers on conservation issues; and other issues relating to health, safety, and the rights and responsibilities of both travelers and tourist industry personnel.

The Charles Darwin Foundation (CDF) has carried out research for the conservation of the Galapagos ecosystem for almost 50 years.  They have been a leader in conservation science and the practical application of information gained and lessons learned in Galapagos, and are one of the most respected non-profit research organizations currently in operation.

Center for Traditional Textiles of Cusco (CTTC)
The CTTC is a non-profit organization established in 1996 to aid in the survival of Incan textile traditions and to provide support to weaving communities. Working with the Center, Quechua weavers and their families in the region of the former Incan capitol are engaged in skills-building, community networking and market development. By researching and documenting complex styles and techniques of the ancestors, the Center helps to ensure that 2,000-year-old textiles traditions will not be lost to future generations. Adventure Life provides an annual donation to the CTTC, and incorporates visits to the center for all of its Peru itineraries that spend time in the Cusco region.

Adventure Life Grant Program
Adventure Life community grants provide funding for grassroots projects in the countries the company operates tours. These grants fund such projects as reforestation efforts, youth festivals and education, operations at a women's shelter, a school science lab, reconstruction of buildings, village irrigation systems, sanitation systems, and a conservation of traditional handicraft techniques.  More information on projects or applying for a grant.

Awards & Mentions
 2016, 2015, 2014, 2013, 2012, & 2011 Travel + Leisure A-List: Top Travel Advisor. Awarded to founder, Brian Morgan, as the go-to travel advisor for Peru and Galapagos tours.
 2015, 2014 Inc. 5000 Fastest Growing Companies
 2015 National Geographic Tours of a Lifetime featuring Undiscovered Brazil tour
 2014 Travel Age West Top Travel Agents in the West. Awarded to founder, Brian Morgan, as the go-to travel advisor for Galapagos tours.
 2013, 2012, 2010, & 2009 Best Places to Work, Outside Magazine
 2013 Travel Weekly Magellan Award
 2013 USA Today Adventure Travel: Top new trips to emerging places
 2011 Outside Magazine Travel Hot List featuring Machu Picchu
 2010 National Geographic Traveler: Tours of a Lifetime featuring Bolivia tours
 2008 Employer of Choice winner, Missoula Job Service Employer's Council
 2007 Best Adventure Travel Companies on Earth, National Geographic Adventure
 2007 Best in Travel Class, Transitions Abroad
 2007 Trip of the Year, Outside Magazine
 2006 Green List Honoree, Conde Nast Traveler
 2006 Best Trips, Outside Magazine,

Media References
Adventure Life has been featured in major publications such as USA Today, The New York Times,
 National Geographic Adventure, Outside  Forbes Life, Condé Nast Traveler, and Inc. Magazine.

References

External links
 Adventure Life homepage
 Adventure Life Reviews
 Adventure Travel Trade Association

Travel and holiday companies of the United States
Adventure travel